Grisoni is a surname. Notable people with the surname include:

André Grisoni (1886-1975), French politician
Giuseppe Grisoni (1699–1769), Italian painter and sculptor
Tony Grisoni (born 1952), British screenwriter

Italian-language surnames